Thomas E. Müller is a German chemist and an academic. He is the Professor of Carbon Sources and Conversion at Ruhr-Universität Bochum.

Müller's research spans the fields of organometallic and polymer chemistry to reaction engineering where he has worked on the fabrication of methods required for the production of polymers as well as on the catalytic activities of alkenes and alkynes during hydroamination. More recently, his work has focused on the field of carbon dioxide utilization, sustainability, hydrogenation of multifunctional molecules and high-performance polymers.

Müller has also co-authored numerous peer-reviewed research papers.

Education
Müller enrolled at the Ludwig Maximilian University (LMU) of Munich in 1986, and received an Intermediate Diploma in Chemistry. Following that, he earned a diploma in chemistry from ETH Zurich in 1991. Subsequently, he completed his PhD in noble metal complexes and clusters from Imperial College London in 1995, and was appointed as a Research Fellow to work on carbon structures and arrays of carbon nanotubes by the University of Sussex. Later, he accomplished habilitation in 2003, focusing on reaction engineering and catalysis, and conceived composite materials and nanostructures from the Technical University of Munich.

Career
Following his habilitation in 2003, Müller started his academic career as a lecturer at the Technical University of Munich. He held a brief appointment in 2005 as an associate professor of Applied Chemistry at the University of Singapore. After joining Bayer MaterialScience AG in 2015 he built the CAT Catalytic Center as part of the industry-academia collaboration with RWTH Aachen University. Later, in 2018 he served as a professor at Rheinische Fachhochschule Köln for a year. Since 2019, he has been a professor of the Chair Carbon Sources and Conversion at Ruhr-University Bochum.

Müller was appointed as the Head of CAT Catalytic Centre (CAT) in 2007.

Research
Müller's research is focused in the fields of organometallic and polymer chemistry, with a particular emphasis on chemical reaction engineering, catalysis, polyurethanes and high-performing polymers. He has accomplished vast recognition in the fabrication of innovative sustainable processes and catalytic concepts in the energy sector of the chemical industry and has also been issued patents on his groundbreaking research on the development of polymeric materials such as polyether thio-carbonate polyols.

Organometallic chemistry
During his early research, Müller worked on organometallic chemistry with an interest in the hydroamination of alkenes and alkynes. His research on the catalytic activity of transition metals on the hydroamination of alkynes revealed that [Cu(CH3CN)4]PF6 and group 12 metals salts have the highest catalytic activity and that of d8 or d10 electronic configuration is present in all catalytically active complexes. In another research he analyzed the Palladium-Catalyzed Cyclization of 6-Aminohex-1-yne and observed [Pd(Triphos)](CF3SO3)2 complex has the highest catalytic activity and also mentioned that ion-exchanged zeolites are at least as active in the hydroamination of 6-aminohex-1-yne as the corresponding homogeneous catalysts. Later, he observed that the presence of protons drastically increases the rate of hydroamination reactions catalyzed by Lewis acidic metals and that supported Rh(I), Pd(II) and Zn(II) complexes have particularly high catalytic activity and selectivity.
 
Apart from finding new catalysts for the hydroamination of alkenes and alkynes, Müller has also determined the X-ray crystal structure of the transition-metal catalyst [PdCl(triphos)](CF3SO3) that is active for the intra-molecular hydroamination of alkynes and novel hydroamination reactions in a liquid–liquid two-phase catalytic system which showed efficient results.

Polymer chemistry
Müller is most known for his work in the polymer industry, especially for his approach towards creating multiple sustainable processes for the synthesis and formation of polymers, including a process for manufacturing poly oxazolidinone polymer compounds. He also proposed a method to synthesize polyether ester carbonate polyols by catalytically adding alkylene oxide and carbon dioxide to an H-functional initiator substance in the presence of a double metal cyanide catalyst. Afterwards, he established a process of creating heterocycle-functional polyoxyalkylene polyol by reacting polyoxyalkylene polyol having unsaturated groups with a heterocyclic compound as well as a method for producing polyether thiocarbonate polyols, multiple bond-containing prepolymer as elastomer precursor, and for the synthesis of polyoxazolidinone compounds.
 
Müller's has elucidated reaction pathways at the initial steps of trioxane polymerization and provided molecular-level insight which benefits further production and properties of polyoxymethylene. In addition to that, he introduced a method for substituting ether units in polyether polyols with oxymethylene moieties to obtain Hydroxy-terminated polyoxymethylene-co-polyoxyalkylene multi-block telechels. A Density Functional Theory (DFT) study evaluated that the co-polymerization of CO2 and ethylene by palladium catalyst is feasible if the ligand set is chosen properly.

Carbon dioxide chemistry
In the area of Carbon dioxide chemistry, Muller has focused on catalysis, facile insertions, and utilization of carbon dioxide and technologies related to it. He distinguished the features of [Cr(babhq)(EtOH)](CF3CO2−) to use it as a catalyst for the reaction of carbon dioxide with epoxides and characterized a novel carbon dioxide (CO2) utilization. The research evaluated that the polyether carbonate polyols synthesized from carbon dioxide with customized CO2 content can aid in producing polyurethanes. Studying the activation of carbon dioxide with in situ ATR-IR spectroscopy and DFT calculations his work revealed insertion of CO2 into metal–phenoxide bonds to be facile and that CO2 insertion into cobalt(III)-oxygen bonds are exothermic.

Anthropogenic carbon cycles
In the later part of Müller's career, his research focus shifted to technologies for closing anthropogenic carbon cycles. Carbon is a chemical element with the symbol C and atomic number 6. It is an essential element of life on Earth, forming the backbone of most organic molecules, including DNA, RNA, and proteins, sugars, cellulose and lignin. The carbon cycle is the process by which carbon moves through Earth's various reservoirs, including the atmosphere, oceans, land, and biosphere. Carbon is continuously exchanged between these reservoirs through a variety of processes, including photosynthesis, respiration, decomposition, and fossil fuel combustion. The increase in atmospheric CO2 concentration has led to a phenomenon known as global warming, which has serious consequences for the planet's ecosystems and human societies. He has proposed efforts to establish anthropogenic carbon cycles that seek to understand and manage the flow of carbon through human activities, such as industrial processes, transportation, and agriculture.

Selected articles
Müller, T. E., Grosche, M., Herdtweck, E., Pleier, A. K., Walter, E., & Yan, Y. K. (2000). Developing transition-metal catalysts for the intramolecular hydroamination of alkynes. Organometallics, 19(2), 170–183.
Neff, V., Müller, T. E., & Lercher, J. A. (2002). Continuous hydroamination in a liquid–liquid two-phase system. Chemical communications, (8), 906–907.
Müller, T. E., Hultzsch, K. C., Yus, M., Foubelo, F., & Tada, M. (2008). Hydroamination: direct addition of amines to alkenes and alkynes. Chemical Reviews, 108(9), 3795–3892.
Peters, M., Köhler, B., Kuckshinrichs, W., Leitner, W., Markewitz, P., & Müller, T. E. (2011). Chemical technologies for exploiting and recycling carbon dioxide into the value chain. ChemSusChem, 4(9), 1216–1240.
Elmas, S., Subhani, M. A., Harrer, M., Leitner, W., Sundermeyer, J., & Müller, T. E. (2014). Highly active Cr (III) catalysts for the reaction of CO2 with epoxides. Catalysis Science & Technology, 4(6), 1652–1657.
Tomkins, P., & Müller, T. E. (2019). Evaluating the carbon inventory, carbon fluxes and carbon cycles for a long-term sustainable world. Green Chemistry, 21(15), 3994–4013.
Hermesmann, M., Grübel, K., Scherotzki, L., & Müller, T. E. (2021). Promising pathways: The Geographic and Energetic Potential of Power-to-X Technologies Based on Regeneratively Obtained Hydrogen. Renewable and Sustainable Energy Reviews 138, 110644.
Tsiklios, C., Hermesmann, M., Müller, T. E. (2022) Hydrogen transport in large-scale transmission pipeline networks: Thermodynamic and environmental assessment of repurposed and new pipeline configurations. Applied Energy 327, 120097. 
Hermesmann, M., Müller, T. E. Green, turquoise, blue, or grey? Environmentally friendly hydrogen production in transforming energy systems. (2022) Progress in Energy and Combustion Science 90, 100996. 
Hermesmann, M., Tsiklios, C., Müller, T. E. (2022) Environmental Assessment of Climate-friendly Hydrogen Supply Chains–A Trade-off between Capacity Utilization and Transport Distance? Energy 2004, 2965. 
Ghosh, A., Singha, A., Chatterjee, R., Müller, T. E., Bhaumik, A., Chowdhury, B. (2023) Influence of heteroatom-doped Fe-carbon sphere catalysts on CO2-mediated oxidative dehydrogenation of ethylbenzene. Molecular Catalysis 535, 112836.

References 

German chemists

German academics

Living people
20th-century births
Year of birth missing (living people)